Wells Fargo Center may refer to:

Wells Fargo Center (Los Angeles), California
Wells Fargo Center (Sacramento), California
Wells Fargo Center (San Francisco), California
Wells Fargo Center for the Arts, Santa Rosa, California
Wells Fargo Center (Denver), Colorado
Wells Fargo Center (Jacksonville), Florida
Wells Fargo Center (Miami), Florida
Wells Fargo Center (Tampa), Florida
Wells Fargo Center (Minneapolis), Minnesota
Wells Fargo Center (Billings), Montana
One Wells Fargo Center, Charlotte, North Carolina
Two Wells Fargo Center, Charlotte, North Carolina
Three Wells Fargo Center, Charlotte, North Carolina
Wells Fargo Center (Winston-Salem), North Carolina
Wells Fargo Center (Portland, Oregon), the tallest building in Oregon
Wells Fargo Center (Philadelphia), Pennsylvania, a multi-purpose indoor sports arena
Wells Fargo Center (Salt Lake City), Utah
Wells Fargo Center (Charlotte), North Carolina
Wells Fargo Center (Norfolk), one of the tallest buildings in Norfolk, Virginia
DocuSign Tower, known as Wells Fargo Center until 2020, Seattle, Washington

See also
Wells Fargo (disambiguation)
Wells Fargo Arena (disambiguation)
Wells Fargo Building (disambiguation)
Wells Fargo Plaza (disambiguation)
Wells Fargo Tower (disambiguation)